Peter Fisher was a Scottish professional association footballer who played as an inside forward.

References

Year of birth missing
Year of death missing
Footballers from Glasgow
Scottish footballers
Association football midfielders
Clyde F.C. players
Stenhousemuir F.C. players
Watford F.C. players
Burnley F.C. players
Dunfermline Athletic F.C. players
English Football League players
Scottish Football League players